Various sports and sports teams have a long tradition in Bratislava, with many sport teams and individuals competing in the best Slovak and international leagues and competitions.
Many significant sports events, such as World and European Championships, have been held in Bratislava. The 2011 Men's Ice Hockey World Championships were held in Bratislava, along with Košice. A new arena was built to host this event.

Football (soccer)
Football (soccer) is currently represented by one club playing the top Slovak football league Fortuna Liga:

ŠK Slovan Bratislava
ŠK (Športový Klub - Sports Club) Slovan was founded on May 3, 1919 as 1. ČsŠK Bratislava (1. Československý športový klub). Its home ground is the Tehelné pole (Brickfield) stadium with a seating capacity of 22,500. ŠK Slovan is the most successful football club in Slovak history and the only winner of the UEFA Cup Winners' Cup from former Czechoslovakia. It won the cup in the 1968-69 season. ŠK Slovan also won the top Slovak and Czechoslovak football leagues and Slovak Cup and Czechoslovak Cup several times. ŠK Slovan has had the most players in the Slovak national football team in history. Many famous Slovak footballers played in ŠK Slovan, for example Peter Dubovský, Jozef Adamec, Karol Jokl, Jozef Vengloš or Róbert Vittek. The club had 7 players in the Czechoslovak team that won the 1976 European Football Championship.

Ice hockey

Three winter sports arenas are situated in Bratislava: Ondrej Nepela Winter Sports Stadium, V.Dzurilla Winter Sports Stadium and Dúbravka Winter Sports Stadium. The ice hockey team HC Slovan Bratislava represents Bratislava in European most prestige ice hockey league KHL. Slovnaft Arena, which is second name of Ondrej Nepela Winter Sports Stadium, is home to HC Slovan. The club, founded in 1939, is a six-times Slovak Extraliga and one-time Czechoslovak Extraliga winner. HC Slovan also won the 2003-04 Continental Cup. Notable former HC Slovan players include Vladimír Dzurilla, Václav Nedomanský, Peter Šťastný, and Miroslav Šatan. Since 1993, Ondrej Nepela Winter Sports Stadium hosts Ondrej Nepela Memorial, an annual senior-level international figure skating competition. It hosted the IIHF Ice Hockey Championship in 2011 and 2019.

Basketball, Handball, Volleyball, and Water Polo 
Inter Arena Pasienky (originally Inter Hala Pasienky) is home to two professional clubs— women's basketball club Slovan Bratislava and men's basketball club Inter Bratislava—and training and playing-ground for other teams. Slovan Bratislava competes in the top Slovak league Women's Extraliga, and Inter Bratislava in Men's Extraliga. ŠKP (Športový Klub Polície - Police Sports Club) Bratislava is a handball club. Its women's handball team, founded in 1993, plays in the Women's Handball International League, which is a joint Czech and Slovak top handball league. And its men's handball a-team competes in Handball International League, a joint Czech and Slovak handball league.
A volleyball team VKP Bratislava (Volejbalový Klub Polície - Police Volleyball Club) plays in men's Extraliga. Slávia UK Bratislava is a sports club of Comenius University (UK - Univerzita Komenského - Comenius University). Its volleyball team plays in women's Extraliga and its water polo team competes in men's Extraliga.

Rugby union
Bratislava is the centre of rugby union in Slovakia. Rugby in Bratislava date back to at least as early as 1927, when it is recorded that ŠK Slávia Bratislava played a match.
Rugby Klub Bratislava has been established in 2005, and is currently playing with club based next to the borders, in Austria, Czech Republic, and Hungary.

Gaelic Football (GAA) 
The Slovak Shamrocks are the first and so far only Gaelic football team in Slovakia. An international club with members from over 16 countries.

The membership of the club consists of individuals from a wide variety of professional backgrounds. It provides an important network of support and is in a position to help its members arrange accommodation, gain employment and grow their social circle after relocating to Bratislava. In July 2011, an Irish Family Sports Day took place in the small town of Čunovo on the outskirts of Bratislava. This modest event saw the first appearance of the Slovak Shamrocks GAA. From these inauspicious beginnings, interest quickly grew in the club, which soon attracted a diverse range of members and followers from all walks of life in Slovakia's capital.

The club now plays in the GAA European Gaelic Football Championships.

Tennis 
National Tennis Centre, which includes Aegon Arena, hosts various cultural, sports and social events. Several Davis Cup matches were played there, including the 2005 Davis Cup final between Slovakia and Croatia. Tatra banka Open, an ATP Challenger Series tournament, is hosted annually in NTC. Slovak professional tennis players Dominik Hrbatý and Karol Kučera were born in Bratislava.

In 1966, Bratislava named its new multi-sports stadium after tennis player Ladislav Hecht.

Other 
Water Sports Centre Čunovo is a slalom and rafting area. The centre is open for public and professionals, including Slovak representatives. The Centre hosts several international and national canoe and kayak competitions annually. 
Devín - Bratislava National run (Národný beh Devín - Bratislava) is the oldest athletic event in Slovakia. The first race was organized in 1921 and the 60th race was celebrated in 2007. The international race is 11,625 metres long and attracts about 1,500 attendants annually. The Bratislava City Marathon is organized annually since 2006. It offers several races, including marathon, half-marathon and skating race.
A race track is located in Petržalka. Horse racing and dog racing events and dog shows are held there regularly.

References